The following is a list of Norfolk State Spartans football seasons for the football team that has represented Norfolk State University in NCAA competition.

Results (2005–present)

Notes

References

 
Norfolk State Spartans
Norfolk State Spartans football seasons